TÜYAP Konya International Fair Center is an international trade fair and convention center of the fair organizer TÜYAP based in Konya, Turkey. The venue occasionally hosts also indoor sports events

The fair ground is locatedat Fevzi Çakmak neighborhood of Karatay district in Konya, Turkey. It has  covered area and  open-air exhibition area. It features press, VIP and administration rooms, two restaurants for 600 visitors in addition to three conference and meeting rooms with a seating capacity of 800. Its parking lot is capable of holding 6,000 vehicles. It has also a helipad.

Trade fairs
Following is a list of trade fairs in 2022:
 Food
Tomato Days Turkey
İSKON - Logistics
KONELEX -  Electrics, Electronics, Electromechanics, Power Peoduction, Automation
KONMAK - Metalworking
KONYASAC - Pipe and profile processing
Agriculture
Potato Days Turkey

Sport events
During the 2021 Islamic Solidarity Games, the venue hosted table tennis, weightlifting and Bocce competitions.

References

Convention centers in Turkey
Trade fairs in Turkey
Tourist attractions in Konya
Sports venues in Konya
Karatay District